Wild City (迷城) is a 2015 Hong Kong-Chinese action film directed by Ringo Lam and starring Louis Koo, Shawn Yue, Tong Liya and Joseph Chang. It was released on 30 July 2015 in China and on 20 August 2015 in Hong Kong. It is Lam's first feature film since 2007's Triangle.

Cast
 Louis Koo as Kwok T-Man
 Shawn Yue as Kwok Siu-hung
 Tong Liya as Yun
 Joseph Chang as Blackie
 Michael Tse as George
 Yuen Qiu as Mona
 Sam Lee as Yan
 Philip Ng as Kwan 
 Philip Keung as Kuen
 Alex Lam as Gei
 Simon Yam as Wong
 Jack Kao as King
 Marc Ma as Leung Ho
 Tam Ping-man as Big Boss

Production
In 2014, the Hong Kong newspaper Apple Daily reported that director Ringo Lam would return to directing with an investment from the Mei Ah Entertainment Group with production set to being in June.

On the first day of filming, Lam collapsed due to a heat stroke. He stayed with the project to keep filming.
In 2014, the film's titled changed from Hustle to Wild City. Louis Koo has stated, Lam insisted that the actors perform their own stunt work in the film to maintain realism.

Variety reported that Lam was in post-production on the film by March 23, 2015.

Style
Lam described Wild City as belonging to a "City Trilogy" along with the films City on Fire and Full Alert. Lam described them as "films, that are all set in Hong Kong and are about people who are lost in the city. In Wild City the theme is about the temptation of money, and how it seduces the protagonists, but also forces them to challenge the plutocracy."

Release
The first trailer was released on 23 March 2015. The film is distributed by Bravos Pictures locally, while international sales are overseen by Distribution Workshop.

The film premiered at the 17th Taipei Film Festival on 10 July 2015. On the film's release in China, it had had approximately 20.2% of all screenings over the weekend, and opened in third place, earning RMB57.4 million (US$9.25 million) from approximately 1.76 million admissions between Friday and Sunday. The film  made RMB88.0 million (US$14.2 million) over four days.

Reception
The Hollywood Reporter stated that Wild City paled in comparison to Lam's films from the 1990s, noting that the "screenplay doesn't have the complexity and rich symbolism of Full Alert (1997) and Victim (1999)". The review concluded that " the film is engaging enough to reignite interest in Lam".

References

External links
 

Hong Kong action thriller films
2015 films
2015 action thriller films
Films directed by Ringo Lam
Films set in Hong Kong
Films shot in Hong Kong
2010s Cantonese-language films
2010s Mandarin-language films
Chinese action thriller films
2010s Hong Kong films